Serruria, or spiderhead is a genus of flowering plants in the family Proteaceae, endemic to South Africa.

Names 
It is called spiderhead in English and spinnekopbos in Afrikaans, because of the silky, finely divided leaves looking like they are covered in spiders webs.

Selected species
Species include:

References

 
Proteaceae genera
Endemic flora of South Africa